Casimirianum is the name of a school, respectively the former institutions: 

 Casimirianum Coburg in Coburg (Bavaria)
 Casimirianum Neustadt in Neustadt an der Weinstraße (Rheinland-Palatinate)